Velp may also refer to either:

 Velp, Gelderland, a town in the Netherlands, part of Rheden municipality
 Velp, North Brabant, a town in the Netherlands, part of Grave municipality
 The Velp or Velpe, a tributary of the River Demer, in the Flemish Region of Belgium